Seti or SETI may refer to:

Astronomy
 SETI, the search for extraterrestrial intelligence.
 SETI Institute, an astronomical research organization
 SETIcon, a former convention organized by the SETI Institute
 Berkeley SETI Research Center, an astronomical research organization
 SETI@home, a distributed computing project
 Active SETI, the attempt to send messages to intelligent aliens

Egyptology
 Seti (commander), grandfather of Seti I
 Seti (Viceroy of Kush)
 Seti I (died 1279 BC), pharaoh
 Seti II (died 1197 BC), pharaoh
 Seti-Merenptah, a son of Seti II
 Seti, son of Amun-her-khepeshef
 Sethi, one of the sons of Ramesses II

Music
 SETI (band), an ambient music band from New York City
 SETI (The Kovenant album), an album by metal band The Kovenant

Places
 Seti River, a tributary of the Karnali River in Nepal
 Seti Gandaki River or Seti River, a tributary of the Trishuli River in Nepal
 Seti Zone, one of the fourteen Zones of Nepal

See also

 Sethi, a surname

 Sette (disambiguation)
 Sete (disambiguation)
 Set (disambiguation)